Evanildo Borges Barbosa Júnior (born January 11, 1990 in Salvador, Bahia), known as Juninho, is a left back who plays for Club Blooming.

Career
In January 2017, Juninho moved to the Kazakhstan Premier League, signing with FC Aktobe.

Honours
Palmeiras
Copa do Brasil: 2012
Campeonato Brasileiro Série B: 2013

Individual
Silver Ball: 2011

References

External links

1990 births
Sportspeople from Bahia
Living people
Brazilian footballers
Brazilian expatriate footballers
Campeonato Brasileiro Série A players
Campeonato Brasileiro Série B players
Kazakhstan Premier League players
Bolivian Primera División players
Grêmio Osasco Audax Esporte Clube players
Figueirense FC players
Coimbra Esporte Clube players
Sociedade Esportiva Palmeiras players
Goiás Esporte Clube players
FC Aktobe players
Esporte Clube Vitória players
Londrina Esporte Clube players
Club Blooming players
Association football fullbacks
Brazilian expatriate sportspeople in Kazakhstan
Brazilian expatriate sportspeople in Bolivia
Expatriate footballers in Kazakhstan
Expatriate footballers in Bolivia